Trimusculus escondidus    is a species of sea snail, a marine gastropod mollusk in the family Trimusculidae.

Original description
          Poppe G. & Groh K. (2009) A new species of Trimusculus (Gastropoda: Eupulmonata: Trimusculidae) from the Central Philippines. Visaya 2(5): 91-93. [September 2009].

References

External links
 Worms Link

Trimusculidae
Gastropods described in 2009
Molluscs of the Philippines